Leeds High School is a four-year public high school in the Birmingham, Alabama, USA, community of Leeds. It is the only high school in the Leeds City School System. School colors are green and white, and the athletic teams are called the Green Wave. Leeds competes in Alabama High School Athletic Association (AHSAA) Class 5A athletics.

History 
The school was established in 1911 by the Jefferson County School System. A two-story brick building was constructed for $10,000 at Parkway Drive (then called First Avenue South) and Montevallo Road. After the completion of additional classrooms for elementary grades in 1914, the school absorbed the pupils of the Leeds Academy, which closed that year.

The first athletic teams included a basketball club which debuted on Thanksgiving Day in 1914, and a football team, then called The Leeders, which took the field in 1923 under head coach N. B. Breland. A girls' basketball team began playing the next year.

Ground was broken for a new school building in 1925. It opened the next year, but was damaged in a fire in 1928 and had to be almost entirely rebuilt. The Works Progress Administration constructed a second wood frame multi-function building with a small auditorium and library in 1933. In 1938, a permanent auditorium and gymnasium were added onto the school. The basement of that building began serving as a cafeteria in 1939.

In 1954, Leeds High School relocated to the former Stadium School on Whitmire Street, which had been constructed in 1948 to serve the children of workers on the Southern Railroad. The 1926 building was demolished in 1966 to make way for a new Leeds Elementary School. Leeds High School and the previously all-Black Moton School were integrated in 1973. The high school was air-conditioned in 1977, along with the construction of a new gymnasium and classroom wing.

In 2009, Leeds High School moved from Whitmire Street to 1500 Greenwave Drive where it stands today. Whitmire St now houses the Leeds Middle School that moved from the Moton location.

Student profile
Enrollment in grades 9-12 for the 2013–14 school year was 477 students. Approximately 55% were white, 30% were African-American, 10% were Hispanic and 5% were multiracial. Roughly 51% of students qualified for free or reduced price lunch.

Leeds has a graduation rate of 96%. Approximately 82% of its students meet or exceed state proficiency standards in both mathematics and reading. The average ACT score for Leeds students is 22.

Athletics
Leeds competes in AHSAA Class 5A athletics and fields teams in the following sports:
 American football
 Archery
 Baseball
 Basketball
 Cheerleading
 Cross country
 Golf
 Indoor track and field
 Outdoor track and field
 Soccer
 Softball
 Tennis
 Volleyball
 Wrestling

Leeds has won state championships in the following sports:
 Boys' basketball (2009)
 American football (2008, 2010, 2014, 2015)
 Boys' indoor track and field (2001, 2002)
 Softball (2007)
 Boys' outdoor track and field (1993, 1994, 1995, 1996, 1998, 2000, 2001, 2005)
 Girls' outdoor track and field (2003, 2004, 2005)
 Wrestling (2015)

Notable alumni 
 Charles Barkley, former basketball forward for the Philadelphia 76ers, Phoenix Suns and Houston Rockets
 Caitlín R. Kiernan, author and paleontologist
 Jonathan D. Rose, professional American football player and CFL/NFL CFL GreyCup Champion (2016), twice East Division All Star currently signed to The Edmonton Football Team.

References

External links 
 Leeds High School website

Public high schools in Alabama
Educational institutions established in 1911
Schools in Jefferson County, Alabama
1911 establishments in Alabama